Save A Lot Food Stores Ltd. is an American discount supermarket chain store headquartered in St. Ann, Missouri, in Greater St. Louis. It is a subsidiary of Onex Corporation with about 900 independently owned and operated stores across 32 states in the United States with over $4 billion in annual sales.

Stores carry most grocery products, with an assortment of fresh, canned and frozen produce, meat, meal products, household items and everyday groceries. Save A Lot grocery stores sell national brands and private label brands at a discounted price.

History
Save A Lot was founded in 1977 by Bill Moran as an alternative to larger supermarkets. He opened the first Save A Lot store in Cahokia, Illinois, and remained with the company until his retirement in 2006.

In 1978, General Grocer Company expanded the company's presence in the greater St. Louis area. Eventually, the store network grew to 30 stores by the end of the decade. At the root of company's growth strategy is its licensee relationship, in which Save A Lot acts as a wholesaler to its independent store owners as opposed to a franchisor. Smaller, independent grocery retailers soon found the limited assortment model to be an effective defensive strategy against the larger chain supermarkets. With help from new licensees, in 1980 alone Save A Lot added 50 stores in the Mid-South region, and a warehouse in Jackson, Tennessee.

In 1984, Save A Lot purchased 75 similar format Jewel T stores and two distribution centers from Jewel in Florida and Pennsylvania.
In 1987, Save A Lot was purchased by St. Louis-based food retailer and wholesaler Wetterau Inc, then owner of former sister stores Shop 'n Save.

In 1994, both the Save A Lot and Shop 'n Save banners became wholly owned subsidiaries of Supervalu Inc, one of the largest independent grocery wholesalers, and the owners of Cub Foods and Scott's Food & Pharmacy at the time. The acquisition opened up Save A Lot's licensee opportunities to conventional Supervalu-supplied operators, including Niemann Foods.

Save A Lot expanded into Southern California with the purchase of 21 discount-grocery Sav U Foods stores, and a distribution center from the Fleming Companies in late 1996.

In 2002, Save A Lot acquired discount variety store chain Deals with 45 stores in the Midwest. The typical Deal$ store had a slightly smaller footprint than Save A Lot and carried mostly non-food merchandise at dollar-increment price points. The Deal$ concept was expanded under Save A Lot to 138 stores by 2006. The acquisition also allowed Save A Lot grocery stores to stock more general merchandise in its grocery stores. The company experimented with hypermarkets which combined the discount grocery and merchandise concepts under one roof. This eventually led to 480 combination stores that did not carry the Deal$ banner. In 2006, Save A Lot sold Deal$ to Dollar Tree for $30.5 million plus inventory. Save A Lot reduced the amount of general merchandise in its combination stores and returned them to its grocery-focused model.

In 2009, Save A Lot expanded its presence internationally. In the Caribbean, Save A Lot opened the first three international licensee grocery stores in Aruba, Freeport- Bahamas and Dominica. Expansion continued with secondary locations opening in Aruba and 8 mile Rock-Bahamas. International interest and growth continued with additional stores opening in St. Vincent, Curaçao, Trinidad and Tobago- (Mount Hope and Diego Martin). From the Caribbean, expansion moved to Central America establishing the brand with the opening of two retail sites in Guatemala City. Grenada was the last international licensee scheduled opening. As of 2018, with the change of corporate ownership the overall corporate strategy shifted to focus all efforts on stateside store growth. The international retail licenses were dissolved and existing international accounts were converted to wholesale accounts. The international stores no longer operate under the Save A Lot brand name or Save A Lot Licensee agreement but as independent retailers.

In late 2009, newly hired Supervalu CEO Craig Herkert announced the goal to double the Save A Lot grocery store network to 2,400 locations within five years. The company would open nearly 100 stores in 2010 with a major focus on the Southeastern United States.

Save A Lot also entered into a licensing affiliation with notable Hispanic grocer Rafael Ortega to rebrand six former Save A Lots in Houston, Texas, and South Texas as "El Ahorro Save A Lot". new stores featured Save A Lot product offerings along with more traditional Hispanic staples.

In late 2010, Rite Aid became a licensed Save A Lot operator when it converted 10 of its existing pharmacies in the Greenville, South Carolina, area to co-branded "Save A Lot/Rite Aid" units.

In September 2012, Supervalu announced it would close 22 Save A Lot stores in seven states. Several executive changes were made by Supervalu on March 4, 2013, including replacing Save-A-Lot CEO Roces with Ritchie Casteel. This came in the midst of plans by Supervalu to sell a number of its other grocery chains to Cerberus Capital Management.

In October 2016, SuperValu sold Save A Lot to Onex Corporation. In April 2020, Save A Lot completed a recapitalization of the business with the company's lenders that canceled approximately $500 million in debt and provided a $350 million capital infusion to the company.  Today Save A Lot is privately held by a number of institutional investors.

Store brands
Save A Lot has an extensive array of store brands.

Aces - candy & confectionery

Allsoft - bath & facial tissue

Being Well — health and beauty products

Boardwalk - carbonated soft drinks

Bramley's - jellies & spreads

Cahokia Farms - beef patties

Caracara - Caribbean foods

Coburn Farms — milk, cheese & dairy

Cody's - meat snacks

Countryside Station - potato products

Crown Creamery - premium ice cream

Crystal Falls — purified drinking water

Dish'd - meal completers

Easton's - Frozen appetizers & meals

Farmington — sliced deli & smoked meats

Ginger Evans — baking products

Glo - cleaning products

Good Nature - eggs

Grissom's — bread and bakery items

Hargis House - canned meats

Home Churned - buttery spreads

J. Higgs — salty snacks

Jade Dragon — Chinese food

Kaskey's — soups

Kiggins - Cereals & snack bars

Kurtz — condiments & sauces

Liv - feminine products

Mantia's — Italian-inspired pastas, sauces & frozen pizzas

Marcum - seasonings  Market Selections - deli items

McDaniel's — coffee

Medeiros - oils & shortening

Morning Delight — breakfast foods

Newbury Mills - crackers

Nutsome — nut-based snacks, nut butters & baking nuts

Oliver & Scout - pet food

Optim - laundry products

Pick 5 - value items

Pickwell Farms - frozen, packaged & canned fruits & vegetables

Portside — seafood

Save Today — discount products

Señora Verde — tortillas and tortilla chips Skillet

Simple Earth - rice

So Cheezy — cheese products

State Street Poultry - frozen chicken

Summerset - tea

Sunny's - cookies & snacks

Tío Santi — Mexican food

Tipton Grove - bottled juices

Triumph - paper products

Truli - almond milk

World's Fair — frozen desserts

Wylwood — canned beans

Licensed owners
In 2020, Save A Lot launched an initiative to convert all company-owned stores to license ownership. Today nearly all Save A Lot locations are owned and operated by independent licensees. Save A Lot supplies much of these stores with its exclusive branded products, but the licensed owners have the freedom to sell other non-Save A Lot products at their stores. Some licensees have added services beyond the traditional Save A Lot model that includes bakeries, delis, liquor, tobacco, money transfers, and fuel services.

The distribution of licensed stores is spread across urban, suburban and rural communities in 32 states in the contiguous United States.

Major licensees include Houchens Industries, Fresh Encounter, Yellow Banana, Saver Group, Leevers, and the Janes Group.

References

 ↑ Barker, Jacob. "Save-A-Lot wrapping up grocery chain's headquarters move to former Northwest Plaza mall". stltoday.com. Retrieved 2018-12-09.
 "Dollar Tree to buy Deal$ for $30.5M" (https://www.bizjournals.com/stlouis/stories/2006/02/20/daily28.html). American City Business Journals. February 22, 2006.
 Sterrett, David (January 30, 2010). "Supervalu Inc. sees local growth potential for Jewel-Osco's discount sibling, Save-A-Lot" (https://www.chicagobusiness.com/article/20100130/ISSUE01/100032970/supervalu-inc-sees-local-growth-potential-for-jewel-osco-s-discount-sibling-save-a-lot). Crain Communications.
 "Save-A-Lot Unveils Partnership for Hispanic Stores" (https://www.supermarketnews.com/latest-news/save-lot-unveils-partnership-hispanic-stores). Supermarket News. July 21, 2010.
 Zwiebach, Elliot (September 13, 2010). "Save-A-Lot, Rite Aid to Test Co-Branded Stores" (https://www.supermarketnews.com/retail-amp-financial/save-lot-rite-aid-test-co-branded-stores). Supermarket News.
 "Supervalu announces additional store closures" (http://drugstorenews.com/article/supervalu-announces-additional-store-closures). Drug Store News. September 5, 2012. Retrieved September 10, 2012.
 "Supervalu closing 22 Save-A-Lot stores" (https://www.stltoday.com/business/local/supervalu-closing-save-a-lot-stores/article_344740da-f824-11e1-b9ad-001a4bcf6878.html). St. Louis Post-Dispatch. September 6, 2012. Retrieved September 10, 2012.
 Solomont, E.B. (March 4, 2013). "Supervalu shakes up leadership of Save-A-Lot, Shop 'N Save" (https://www.bizjournals.com/stlouis/blog/2013/03/supervalu-shakes-up-leadership-of.html). American City Business Journals.
 "Supervalu to Sell Save-A-Lot Chain to Onex for $1.37 Billion" (https://www.bloomberg.com/news/articles/2016-10-17/supervalu-to-sell-save-a-lot-to-onex-for-1-37-billion-in-cash). Bloomberg News. October 17, 2016.
 Save A Lot Nets $350M in Recapitalization" (https://www.winsightgrocerybusiness.com/retailers/save-lot-nets-350m-recapitalization). Winsight Grocery Business. April 3, 2020.
 "Save A Lot shifts to wholesale model" (https://www.supermarketnews.com/retail-financial/save-lot-shifts-wholesale-model). Supermarket News. December 28, 2020.
 https://ownasavealot.com/licensing-opportunities/

Onex Corporation
American companies established in 1977
Retail companies established in 1977
Companies based in St. Louis County, Missouri
Supermarkets of the United States
Discount stores of the United States
1992 mergers and acquisitions
2016 mergers and acquisitions